Mainardi is an Italian surname. Notable people with the surname include:

Andrea Mainardi, Italian Renaissance painter
Bastiano Mainardi (1460–1513), Italian Renaissance painter
Danilo Mainardi (1933–2017), Italian ethologist, scholar, and writer
Elisa Mainardi (born 1930), Italian actress
Enrico Mainardi (1897–1976), Italian classical cellist, composer and conductor
Francesco Mainardi (born 1942), Italian physicist and mathematician
Gaspare Mainardi (1800–1879), Italian mathematician
Giovanni Manardo (1462–1536), Italian physician, botanist and humanist
Lattanzio Mainardi, Italian Renaissance painter

Italian-language surnames